Eucalyptus × stoataptera is a small tree that is endemic to a small area on the south coast of Western Australia. It has a dense crown, smooth bark on the trunk and branches, glossy, oblong leaves, single flower buds in leaf axils, lemon-orange flowers, and fruit that are square in cross-section. It is a natural hybrid between Eucalyptus stoatei and E. tetraptera.

Description
Eucalyptus × stoataptera is a tree that typically grows to a height . It has smooth dark grey and light grey bark on the trunk and branches.

Taxonomy and naming
Eucalyptus × stoataptera was first formally described in 1995 by Eleanor Marion Bennett in the journal Nuytsia from specimens she collected between Ravensthorpe and Hopetoun in 1991. The specific epithet is a combination of the names of its parents, E. stoatei and E. tetraptera.

Distribution and habitat
This eucalypt grows in low to medium mallee shrubland with the parent species and E. kessellii in the Esperance Plains biogeographic region.

References

Eucalypts of Western Australia
stoataptera
Myrtales of Australia
Taxa named by William Blakely
Plants described in 1995
Plant nothospecies